

Ruhnu Lighthouse (Estonian: Ruhnu tuletorn) is a lighthouse located on the island of Ruhnu (in the Gulf of Riga), in Estonia.

History 

The first mention of a lighthouse on the island of Ruhnu is from the year of 1646. The current lighthouse was made in 1877, by Forges et Chantiers de la Méditerranée, a company based in France. According to rumours, the unusual design of the Ruhnu Lighthouse was made by Gustave Eiffel, however no actual proof has been given. The lighthouse's structure is made out of metal, supported by four counterforts. The lighthouse had a gallery and a sentry room, which was destroyed during World War I.  The lighthouse was rebuilt in 1937.

See also 

 List of lighthouses in Estonia

References

External links 

 

Lighthouses completed in 1877
Resort architecture in Estonia
Lighthouses in Estonia
Ruhnu
1877 establishments in the Russian Empire